Poortwachter  is a tram stop within the city of Amstelveen, Netherlands. The stop lies along tram line 25, which was dubbed the Amsteltram before it received its line number. It opened officially on 13 December 2020, unofficially 4 days earlier on 9 December.

Poortwachter was earlier a stop for metro line 51, a hybrid metro/sneltram (light rail) service, and was the southern terminal of that line before it was extended to Westwijk in 2004. Like a metro, the sneltram used high-level platforms. Metro line 51 service south of Amsterdam Zuid station was closed in 2019 to rebuild stations for lower platforms in order to accommodate the new low-floor trams for line 25.

References

External links
GVB website 
Tram stops in Amsterdam
Railway stations opened in 2004